Brandov is a municipality and village in Most District in the Ústí nad Labem Region of the Czech Republic. It has about 300 inhabitants.

Gallery

References

Villages in Most District
Villages in the Ore Mountains